Herbert William "Buddy" O'Connor (June 21, 1916 – August 24, 1977) was a Canadian professional ice hockey centre who played for the Montreal Canadiens and New York Rangers in the National Hockey League between 1941 and 1951. He won the Hart Trophy and Lady Byng Trophy in 1948.

Playing career
O'Connor played for the Montreal Canadiens from 1941 to 1947 and won two Stanley Cups during his career in 1944 and 1946 while playing for the Canadiens.

In 1947, O'Connor was traded to the New York Rangers. He had 60 points that season, finishing second to Montreal's Elmer Lach in the scoring race. He was also awarded the Hart Memorial Trophy and Lady Byng Memorial Trophy and was the first player to win both in the same year. He was also the first Ranger to win the Hart. These achievements were reflected in his being named winner of the Lionel Conacher Award, as Canada's male athlete of the year for 1948.

O'Connor played for the Rangers until 1951. He was inducted into the Hockey Hall of Fame in 1988, becoming the first inductee into the now-defunct Veteran category.

In the 2009 book 100 Ranger Greats, the authors ranked O'Connor at No. 38 all-time of the 901 New York Rangers who had played during the team's first 82 seasons.

Career statistics

Regular season and playoffs

Personal
In the mid-1950s, Danny Gallivan was known to assist with the Department of Education's Physical Fitness Division's annual hockey school in PEI, along with NHL chief referee Roy Storey and NHL star Buddy O'Connor.

References

External links

1916 births
1977 deaths
Anglophone Quebec people
Canadian expatriate ice hockey players in the United States
Canadian ice hockey centres
Cincinnati Mohawks (AHL) players
Hart Memorial Trophy winners
Hockey Hall of Fame inductees
Ice hockey people from Montreal
Lady Byng Memorial Trophy winners
Montreal Canadiens players
Montreal Royals (QSHL) players
New York Rangers players
Place of death missing
Stanley Cup champions